Dorina Emilia Carbune (born February 22, 1985) is a Romanian female handballer, who plays for Kastamonu Bld. GSK and the Romanian national team.

She played in her country for CS Tomis Constanța (2005–2008) before she moved in 2009 to Turkey to join the Istanbul-based club Üsküdar Belediyespor in the Turkish Women's Handball Super League. In 2011, she transferred to Muratpaşa Bld. SK in Antalya. Since 2015, she is with Kastamonu Bld. GSK.

References
 

1985 births
People from Timiș County
Romanian female handball players 
Romanian expatriate sportspeople in Turkey
Expatriate handball players in Turkey
Üsküdar Belediyespor players
Muratpaşa Bld. SK (women's handball) players
Kastamonu Bld. SK (women's handball) players
Living people